The Taiwanese Ambassador to Haiti is the official representative of the Republic of China to the Republic of Haiti.

List of representatives

References 

Haiti
China
1956 establishments in Taiwan